Dharmadhatu (Sanskrit) is the 'dimension', 'realm' or 'sphere' (dhātu) of the Dharma or Absolute Reality.

Definition
In Mahayana Buddhism, dharmadhātu means "realm of phenomena", "realm of truth". It is referred to by several analogous terms from Mahayana Buddhist philosophy, such as Tathata (Reality "as-it-is"), emptiness, dependent co-arising and eternal Buddha. It is the "deepest nature, or essence".

Dharmadhātu is the purified mind in its natural state, free of obscurations. It is the essence-quality or nature of mind, the fundamental ground of consciousness of the trikaya, which is accessed via the mindstream.

When the buddha-nature has been realised, dharmadhātu is also referred to as the Dharmakāya, the Body of Dharma Truth.

It is associated with Vairocana.

Historical origin
Kang-nam Oh traces the origin of dharmadhatu to the Avatamsaka Sutra. It has been further developed by the Hua-yen school:

Understanding in Buddhist tradition

Indian Buddhism

Śrīmālādevī Sūtra
The Śrīmālādevī Sūtra (3rd century CE), also named The Lion's Roar of Queen Srimala, centers on the teaching of the tathagatagarbha as "ultimate soteriological principle". It states that the tathagata-garbha is the "embryo" of the Dharmadhatu and the Dharmakaya:

In the Śrīmālādevī Sūtra, there are two possible states for the Tathagatagarbha:

The sutra itself states it this way:

Dharmadhātustava
The Dharmadhātustava ("In praise of the Dharmadhatu"), attributed to Nāgārjuna though questioned, is a treatise on the dharmadhatu. According to the Dharmadhātustava, the dharmadhatu is the ground which makes liberation possible:

According to the Dharmadhātustava, the dharmadhatu is seen when the afflictions are purified:

Chinese Buddhism

Mahaparinirvana Sutra
In the Mahayana Mahaparinirvana Sutra, the Buddha states of himself that he is the "boundless Dharmadhatu" - the totality itself.

Tibetan Buddhism

Five Wisdoms
The Dharmadhatu is comprehended by one of the Five Wisdoms:
 Dharmadhātu wisdom, 
 Mirror-like wisdom, 
 Equality wisdom, 
 Discriminating wisdom, 
 All-accomplishing wisdom.

Dzogchen
In the Dzogchen text Gold refined from ore the term Dharmadhatu is translated as 'total field of events and meanings' or "field of all events and meanings".

See also
 Buddha-nature
 Four Dharmadhātu
 Ground (Dzogchen)
 Śūnyatā
 Tathātā
 Dharmakāya

Notes

References

Sources

Published sources

Web-sources

Further reading
 Karl Brunholzl (2008), In Parise of Dharmadhatu

External links
 Digital Dictionary of Buddhism, log in with "guest"
 The Seeker's Glossary of Buddhism, see: Dharma Realm, p. 190

Buddhist philosophical concepts
Nondualism
Shentong